Maksym Oleksandrovych Pryadun (born 17 February 1997) is a Ukrainian professional footballer who plays as a centre-forward for Metalist Kharkiv.

Career
Maksym Pryadun was born in Uman. Pryadun is a product of FC Olimpik Kirovohrad and FC Illichivets youth sportive school systems. Then he signed a professional contract with FC Illichivets Mariupol in the Ukrainian Premier League.

He made his debut for FC Zirka as a substituted player in the second half-time in the match against FC Volyn Lutsk on 20 May 2017 in the Ukrainian Premier League. Next season in August of 2017, Pryadun was recognized as a player of the month in the Ukrainian Premier League.

References

External links
 
 
 

1997 births
Living people
People from Uman
Ukrainian footballers
Association football forwards
FC Mariupol players
FC Vorskla Poltava players
FC Zirka Kropyvnytskyi players
FC Arsenal Kyiv players
FC Metalist 1925 Kharkiv players
FC Lokomotiv Yerevan players
MFC Mykolaiv-2 players
MFC Mykolaiv players
FC Olimpik Donetsk players
FC Metalist Kharkiv players
Ukrainian Premier League players
Ukrainian First League players
Ukrainian Second League players
Armenian First League players
Ukrainian expatriate footballers
Ukrainian expatriate sportspeople in Armenia
Expatriate footballers in Armenia
Sportspeople from Cherkasy Oblast